Agrotis obliqua is a moth of the family Noctuidae first described by Edgar Albert Smith in 1903. It is found in North America from Newfoundland to Vancouver Island, south to Colorado, Arizona and California.

The wingspan is about 30 mm. Adults are on wing in spring and early summer. There is one generation per year.

References

"Agrotis obliqua (Smith 1903)". Moths of North Dakota. Retrieved November 15, 2020.

Agrotis
Moths of North America
Moths described in 1903